George Edward Rath (March 29, 1913 – November 18, 1995) was the seventh Bishop of Newark.

Biography
Rath was born in Buffalo, New York, and ordained as a deacon in 1938. He received his undergraduate degree cum laude from Harvard University in 1933, and a master of divinity degree from Union Theological Seminary in 1936. He was ordained as a priest in 1939 for the Diocese of New York where he served as college chaplain for Columbia University and New York University.  In 1941 he became the vicar of All Saints Church in Millington, New Jersey.  He later became the rector of the church and then the Archdeacon of Morris County. He was elected suffragan bishop of Newark in 1964 when he succeeded Donald MacAdie. He was consecrated by Arthur C. Lichtenberger.

He was elected coadjutor bishop on May 2, 1970. He became diocesan bishop in 1974 and retired in 1978. As bishop, he championed the causes of the civil rights movement, the anti-Vietnam War movement, and prayer book reform. He was also a long-standing supporter of ordination for women, but waited to do so until the practice had been definitively approved by the Episcopal Church, unlike more radical bishops.

He and his wife, Margaret, had two children.

References

External links 
 Retired Newark Bishop Rath Dies

1913 births
1995 deaths
Harvard University alumni
Union Theological Seminary (New York City) alumni
20th-century American Episcopalians
Episcopal bishops of Newark
20th-century American clergy